The word Tenji can refer to several things in Japanese, including:

 Tenji (点字) is a system of Japanese Braille.
 Emperor Tenji (天智天皇 Tenji Tennō) is the name of an emperor of Japan.
 Tenji (天治) was a Japanese era after Hōan and before Daiji, lasting from 1124 to 1126.  The reigning Emperor was Emperor Sutoku.

Japanese eras